General Charles Stuart (16 March 1810 – 9 September 1892) was a British politician and an officer in the British Army.

Military career
Stuart was born on 16 March 1810, the son of Captain John James Stuart, son of General Sir Charles Stuart (1753–1801), and Albinia Sullivan.

Stuart was Colonel of the 2nd Battalion, Duke of Cornwall's Light Infantry, and a Deputy Lieutenant of Bute.

Stuart was elected as the member of parliament (MP) for Buteshire at the 1832, but resigned in 1833.

Stuart died on 9 September 1892, at the age of 82.

References

External links 
 
 

1810 births
1892 deaths
British Army generals
Members of the Parliament of the United Kingdom for Scottish constituencies
UK MPs 1832–1835
Deputy Lieutenants of Buteshire
Duke of Cornwall's Light Infantry officers